Choi Jung-sook is a female former international table tennis player from South Korea.

Table tennis career
She won a bronze medal at the 1969 World Table Tennis Championships in the women's doubles with Choi Hwan-hwan and won a second bronze two years later in the Corbillon Cup (women's team event) at the 1971 World Table Tennis Championships.  

She also won four medals in the Asian Championships.

See also
 List of table tennis players
 List of World Table Tennis Championships medalists

References

Living people
South Korean female table tennis players
Asian Games medalists in table tennis
Table tennis players at the 1966 Asian Games
Asian Games silver medalists for South Korea
Asian Games bronze medalists for South Korea
Medalists at the 1966 Asian Games
World Table Tennis Championships medalists
Year of birth missing (living people)
20th-century South Korean women